Anarch may refer to:
 Anarchist, a person who adheres to the ideology of anarchism
 Anarch (sovereign individual) in the 1977 novel Eumeswil
 A fictional sect of vampires in the tabletop game Vampire: The Masquerade
 The 16th novel in the Gaunt's Ghosts series of novels
 * A main character in 1967 novel Counter-Clock World by Philip K. Dick. Anarch Thomas Peak

See also 
 Thy Hand, Great Anarch!, a book by Nirad C. Chaudhuri